Eva Cohn Galambos (July 1, 1928 – April 19, 2015), was a German-born American economist and politician who served as the first mayor of Sandy Springs, Georgia.  She served as the city's inaugural Mayor from December 1, 2005, until January 7, 2014, when Rusty Paul took office as the city's second mayor.

Early life and education
Born Eva Cohn in Berlin, Germany, her father was a judge. He was ousted from his position, along with other prominent Jews, in 1933 when Adolf Hitler came to power. The family then moved to Genoa, Italy, where they lived for six years before moving to the United States and settling in Athens, Georgia, where her father got a job at the University of  Georgia with the help of prominent alumnus Harold Hirsch. Galambos attended Athens High School and graduated as valedictorian in 1944. She later graduated from the University of Georgia in 1948 with a Bachelor of Business Administration degree. Later in life she earned a master's degree (M.A.) in labor and industrial relations from the University of Illinois and a Ph.D. in economics from Georgia State University. She was the recipient of the 2011 Andrew Young School Distinguished Alumni Award from the Andrew Young School of Policy Studies at Georgia State University.

Labor activism
An activist, who advocated for workers, Galambos landed her first professional job as Associate Editor of the Atlanta Journal of Labor, writing local copy to interest the union members. Her "love for activism" extended to campaigning for rent control in the city of Atlanta. While "thanked" for her research, the practice, adopted in New York, was not enacted in a Southern city more sensitive to issues of government overreach. Galambos later obtained a position, working on behalf of the International Association of Machinists.

She was a labor economist for many years, teaching at Clark Atlanta University and Georgia State University.

Politics
Galambos had held various positions in the Sandy Springs community before being elected the first mayor of the city in early November 2005. She was the president of the Committee for Sandy Springs, 1975–2005, which fought to incorporate Sandy Springs. She was also a co-founder and former secretary of Sandy Springs Revitalization; founder of Sandy Springs Clean and Beautiful; chairwoman of services committee for the Sandy Springs Council of Neighborhoods; former chairwoman of the Fulton County Public Housing Authority; and founder of Sandy Springs Civic Roundtable.

Death
She died of cancer on April 19, 2015, at the age of 86. Her funeral was held at Temple Kehillat Chaim in Roswell, Georgia on April 21, 2015.

Bibliography

References

External links

1928 births
2015 deaths
Mayors of places in Georgia (U.S. state)
Women mayors of places in Georgia (U.S. state)
Jewish American people in Georgia (U.S. state) politics
Jewish mayors of places in the United States
University of Georgia alumni
Georgia State University alumni
University of Illinois alumni
German emigrants to the United States
People from Sandy Springs, Georgia
People from Berlin
Deaths from cancer in Georgia (U.S. state)
Jewish emigrants from Nazi Germany to Italy